Bob Berry (born November 29, 1943) is a Canadian former professional ice hockey left winger who played eight seasons in the National Hockey League with the Montreal Canadiens and Los Angeles Kings between 1968 and 1977. He has also served as a head coach in the NHL for the Los Angeles Kings, Montreal Canadiens, Pittsburgh Penguins and St. Louis Blues between 1978 and 1994.

Playing career
Born in Montreal, Quebec, Berry began his junior hockey career with the Peterborough Petes of the OHA before deciding to attend Sir George Williams University (now Concordia University) in Montreal where he would play three years of collegiate hockey in the OQAA (now CIS). In 1966 Berry joined Canada's National Hockey Team and was later signed by the Montreal Canadiens to his first professional contract in 1968 at age 25. With the Canadiens having a deep roster at left wing, Berry would only manage to suit up for two games with the Canadiens in 1968-69. He spent the following year playing in the AHL for the Montreal Voyageurs and the Canadiens eventually sold his rights to the Los Angeles Kings in 1970 giving him a better opportunity to earn a spot on an NHL roster. Berry joined the Los Angeles Kings the following year in 1970-71 and registered 63 points in 73 games in his rookie season, placing him only 9 points back of eventual Calder Trophy winner Gil Perreault of the Buffalo Sabres. In 1972-73 Berry scored a career high 36 goals with the Kings and was selected to play in his first NHL All-Star game on January 30, 1973 at Madison Square Garden in New York. Berry was selected to play in the All-Star game again the following year at the Chicago Stadium. He finished his NHL career with 350 points in 541 regular season games.

Coaching career

Los Angeles Kings
After retiring as a player in 1978 with the AHL's Springfield Indians, he returned to Los Angeles to become the eighth head coach in Kings history in 1978-79. He led the Kings to the Stanley Cup playoffs in each of his three seasons behind the bench. However, in each of those years from 1978–79 to 1980–81 they were defeated in the opening round of the playoffs. Berry eventually resigned as head coach at the end of the 1980–81 campaign after the Kings posted a 43W–24L–13T record and lost to the New York Rangers in the preliminary round. Despite his lack of success in the playoffs, Berry is credited with giving rise to the famed "Triple Crown Line" during his tenure as head coach, putting Marcel Dionne, Charlie Simmer and Dave Taylor on the same line for the very first time in a game at Joe Louis Arena in 1979 vs. the Detroit Red Wings.

Montreal Canadiens
He moved on to take the head coaching assignment in his hometown of Montreal replacing Claude Ruel behind the Canadiens bench to start the 1981–82 NHL season. Despite winning 46 and 42 games respectively in his first two years at the helm, His Canadiens were eliminated in the first round of the Stanley Cup playoffs in 1981–82 (by the Quebec Nordiques) and in 1982–83 (by the Buffalo Sabres). This would mark the fifth straight season he would lose in the first round of the playoffs as a head coach. With the team playing below .500 in his third year behind the bench in 1983–84, he was eventually fired by the Canadiens and was replaced by Jacques Lemaire 63 games into the season.  To date, he is the last non-interim Canadiens coach who was not fully bilingual in English and French, though he spoke French well enough to have a simple conversation.

Pittsburgh Penguins
He was named the 9th head coach in Pittsburgh Penguins history on June 4, 1984 a mere 5 days prior to the 1984 NHL Entry Draft that was held at the Montreal Forum in which Pittsburgh Penguins general manager Eddie Johnston selected Mario Lemieux 1st overall from the Laval Voisins of the QMJHL. Even though
Berry's new team drafted their future franchise player, he inherited a Penguins team that had failed to reach the playoffs the previous two seasons. That streak continued under his guidance for the next three seasons as the Penguins missed reaching the playoffs for the fifth straight year in 1986-87. He was eventually relieved of his head coaching position at the end of the 1986–87 NHL season on April 13, 1987.

St. Louis Blues
He returned to coaching for the 1988–89 NHL season after a two-year hiatus, this time joining the St. Louis Blues coaching staff as an assistant with Joe Micheletti under head coach Brian Sutter. He finally got a taste of playoff success behind the bench as his team defeated the Minnesota North Stars in the opening round of the playoffs 4–1. The Blues then faced their rival, the Chicago Blackhawks in round 2 but lost that series in five games.

The Blues qualified for the playoffs in the following three seasons. However, they were unable to advance past the second round in either of those years. Berry was appointed assistant GM of the Blues under GM Ron Caron in the summer before the start of the 1992–93 season. The Blues then hired former St. Louis defenceman Bob Plager to take over the head coaching duties. After the Blues got off to a slow start Plager stepped down after a 6–4 victory over Berry's former team, the Pittsburgh Penguins, on October 30, 1992. He took over the head coaching duties after Plager's departure and from there he helped the Blues reach the playoffs once again in the spring of 1993. The Blues swept the Chicago Blackhawks in the first round, and he finally made it to the second round of the post-season as a head coach in the NHL. However, his post-season success, as well as the Blues,' was short lived as Berry's team was knocked out in the second round by the Toronto Maple Leafs in a hard fought 7 games series that went the distance. He remained on as head coach of the Blues the next season with Ted Sator joining the fold as an assistant. The Blues made the playoffs once again but were swept in the first round by the Dallas Stars. The St. Louis Blues then named Mike Keenan head coach to start the 1994-95 NHL season with Berry and Sator staying on staff as associate coaches. It remained status quo for the Blues with Keenan and Berry behind the bench as they failed to advance past the second round the following two seasons. 1995–96 would be his final season behind the Blues bench.

San Jose Sharks
In San Jose, his was hired on as an assistant under head coach Darryl Sutter to replace the departed Roy Sommer, teaming up with former Calgary Flame tough guy Paul Baxter who was already in place as Sutter's other assistant. He spent two seasons in San Jose as an assistant under Sutter before retiring as a coach in 1999-2000.

Front office
He currently serves as a pro scout for the Chicago Blackhawks. He has also served as a pro scout in the NHL for the Los Angeles Kings, St. Louis Blues and Ottawa Senators.

Awards and achievements
 Scored first ever goal at Pacific Coliseum in Vancouver Canucks inaugural NHL game, October 9, 1970.
 Played in 26th annual NHL All-Star game, January 30, 1973. (Madison Square Garden) New York, NY.
 Played in 27th annual NHL All-Star game, January 29, 1974. (Chicago Stadium) Chicago, IL.

Career statistics

Regular season and playoffs

Coaching record

Transactions
 Sold by the Montreal Canadiens to the Los Angeles Kings, October 8, 1970.

References

External links
 

1943 births
Living people
Anglophone Quebec people
Canadian ice hockey coaches
Canadian ice hockey left wingers
Chicago Blackhawks scouts
Cleveland Barons (1937–1973) players
Ice hockey people from Montreal
Los Angeles Kings coaches
Los Angeles Kings players
Los Angeles Kings scouts
Montreal Canadiens coaches
Montreal Canadiens players
Montreal Canadiens scouts
Montreal Voyageurs players
Ottawa Senators scouts
Peterborough Petes (ice hockey) players
Pittsburgh Penguins coaches
St. Louis Blues coaches
St. Louis Blues executives
St. Louis Blues scouts
San Jose Sharks coaches
Springfield Indians players